Deir Ba'albah (also spelled Dayr Baalbeh) is the north-easternmost neighborhood of the city of Homs in central Syria. Nearby places include the al-Bayda and al-Abbasiyah neighborhoods to the south, and the villages of al-Mishirfeh and al-Jabiriyah to the northeast. According to the Syria Central Bureau of Statistics (CBS), Deir Ba'albah had a population of 44,975 in the 2004 census. Its inhabitants are predominantly Sunni Muslims.

References

Bibliography

Neighborhoods of Homs